The  is a Japanese manga written and illustrated by Ayano Yamane. It is serialized in the semimonthly  manga magazine Be × Boy Gold since 2002. Several adaptations of the manga have been released, including original video animations, light novels, and audio drama CDs.

Plot
Twenty-three-year-old Akihito Takaba (高羽 秋仁 Takaba Akihito) is a young freelance photographer who takes pride in his work and seeks to get a major "scoop". After he takes photographs of the business dealings of crime lord Ryuichi Asami (麻見 隆一 Asami Ryūichi), Asami kidnaps him, beginning a relationship between them as they find themselves continually drawn to one another. Liu Fei Long (劉飛龍 Ryū Feiron, Chinese: Liú Fēilóng), a rival Chinese boss who blames Asami for his father's death, takes an interest in Takaba, as well, seeking a way to get revenge. Afterwards, Fei Long kidnaps Takaba, and Asami steals an important document of Fei Long's, which he uses to trade Takaba with.

Characters

A freelance photographer and a college student who has just started working on his own; he's shown to be very athletic. Before he even got started into his career, he was a troublemaking delinquent during his high school years who has had numerous run-ins with the police until his father helped influence him into a better life path; he currently lives on his own in a condo where he also has his photography studio. He still strives to get a great scoop, as he often does gigs for magazine shoots, catalogs, and Miai photos. He first met Asami during the Sion Incident, which lead to Asami kidnapping as well as raping him-(de-virginizing him); as the series progresses, his relationship with Asami develops into a more romantic tone. He later arms himself with a firearm of his own, for protective purposes.

A shrewd, powerful businessman who deals in shady businesses as well has having connections with underworld leaders in both Japan and China; he stands out not just for his professional assassin skills and talent but for his cold and beautiful looks; he is shown to own numerous types of firearms. Given his powerful status, he has friends and enemies in many places across Japan, and possibly other parts of the world; not much of his past or his personal background is revealed, and it is unknown as to why and how he ended up in such shady businesses. While he seems bitter and heartless at first, he does have a more caring and protective side, especially towards Akihito-(his love interest) and his subordinates.

One of Akihito's friends and classmates from college.

One of Akihito's friends and classmates from college.

The Head of Chinese drug syndicate, and leader of a Chinese Mafia group. His stronghold is located in Hong Kong. He was raised as the second son of the Hong Kong Mafia, the Ryou family, along with his brother, Yan-tzu. He assists his brother and does the dirty work. A man who pines for his father's attention, he is unaware that he is not the Ryou's true son, and that Yan-tzu harbors lustful designs towards him.

The young leader of the Russian Mafia who is after Baishe's Casino in Macau and is very interested in Feilong's surroundings.

Feilong's trusted subordinate; however, he's actually a spy who was sent to Feilong's organization by Asami.

A young servant boy who tends to Feilong's needs. When he was much younger, Tao was a homeless orphan until Feilong brought him into his care; his position of work consists of taking care of his master, house cleaning, and serving tea. Since he doesn't attend school, he is instead homeschooled by a tutor, with Feilong sometimes helping him out with his homework. He speaks both Cantonese as well as some Japanese-(which he later makes improvements in).

Media

Manga
The Finder series is written by Ayano Yamane. It is serialized in the manga magazines Be x Boy Gold and B-Boy Zips. The individual chapters were collected and published in 10 tankōbon volumes. Biblos originally published the series from 2002 to 2005. Following the Biblos' bankruptcy in 2006, Libre acquired the series in 2007, reprinting the first three volumes before continuing its release.

In 2004, Central Park Media licensed the Finder series in English for North American distribution under its Be Beautiful Manga imprint. After Libre acquired Biblos' assets following the latter's bankruptcy, they accused Central Park Media of infringing on its copyright of the transferred Biblos properties, stating that all foreign license holders needed to negotiate new licenses with Libre as those Biblos had sold ended with the company's bankruptcy. John O'Donnell, then manager of Central Park Media refused Libre's claims and felt that Biblos's original license agreements were still valid. In 2009, Central Park Media filed for bankruptcy and its assets, including licenses, were liquidated. Finder was not listed among the assets, indicating Central Park Media no longer held the license.

In March 2010, Digital Manga Publishing announced that it had acquired the English license to the Finder series, publishing the series under their Juné imprint. On June 18, 2016, Digital Media announced that their publishing agreement with Libre was terminating at the end of the month. On July 7, 2016, Viz Media acquired the licensing arrangements to publish the series under their SuBLime imprint. Since Volume 8 was released in Japan in May 2016, SubLime stated that they would publish Volume 8 first by March 2017, and then republish the first seven volumes every other month beginning in May 2017.

Volume list

Light novels

A light novel adaptation was written by Ai Satoko and published by Libre, with illustrations provided by Yamane.

Other media

Anime
A special anime adaptation of 'Target in the Finder' (ファインダーの標的) was recently released by ANiMix Project on February 29, 2012 - starring Japanese voice actors Tetsuya Kakihara as Akihito, Takaya Kuroda as Asami, and Nobuo Tobita as Feilong. It is not really a fully animated animation, as the animation was limited to only the character's mouth, eyes, and some important body movements of the scenes. A special Cast Talk CD was included in First Press edition. A preview of an ANiMiX was made for the manga series Yebisu Celebrities.

Drama CDs
A 2-disk drama CD of the first volume of the series was re-released by Geneon Entertainment under its "Cue Egg" label on May 25, 2007, containing 10 audio tracks. It featured the voices of Akira Sasanuma, Takehito Koyasu, and Hideo Ishikawa as the three central characters.
The second released 2-disk drama CD is the third volume of the series, 'One Wing in the Finder' (ファインダーの隻翼), released by Libre Publishing on September 28, 2011. It featured the voices of Tetsuya Kakihara as Akihito, Takaya Kuroda as Asami, and Nobuo Tobita as Feilong. It includes the complete Japan chapter of "Naked Truth"! and this set also contains "Hard-Working Cameraman Akihito Takaba's Refined Day" and "Love Surprise"! A special Cast Talk CD was included if you exclusively bought from Libre online store.

Others
A character book was released December 18, 2007 that included a pull-out poster.

Reception
In May 2009, Germany's Federal Department for Media Harmful to Young Persons labeled the first volume of Finder as "harmful to young persons", which results in the first volume of the series being "restricted to people of legal age only. It is also prohibited to show incriminated content as teasers, trailers or in any other advertising context." In response, Tokyopop Germany removed the information about the first volume from its website, but continued to list the other three volumes it had already published.

In Manga: The Complete Guide, Jason Thompson gave the series a rating of 3½ out of four stars, stating that the series is "written in an appropriately dark and brooding fashion" due to its use of "graphic sex and S&M", and praised the art as "coolly attractive".

Digital Manga Publishing's translation of volume 3 ranked #4 on The New York Times Best Seller list for manga the week of May 1, 2011. SuBLime's translation of volume 7 ranked #1 on The New York Times Manga Bestseller List.

References

External links
 
 

2002 manga
2012 anime OVAs
Anime 18
Crime in anime and manga
Erotic thriller anime and manga
Digital Manga Publishing titles
SuBLime manga
Yaoi anime and manga